Ronildo Pereira de Freitas (born 23 October 1977 in Montes Claros, Minas Gerais), known as Tininho, is a Brazilian retired footballer. On the left side of the pitch, he operated as either a midfielder or a defender.

Football career
In May 1998, at the age of 20, Tininho left Brazil and Associação Portuguesa de Desportos to sign with Feyenoord in the Netherlands. In his first season with the Rotterdam team, he appeared in 28 games to help them win the Eredivisie after a six-year wait.

After a brief spell back in his country with América Futebol Clube (MG), Tininho returned to the Netherlands, where he would remain for the following five seasons always in the top flight, with RBC Roosendaal, NEC Nijmegen and ADO Den Haag. In 2007, he joined AEK Larnaca F.C. from Cyprus, playing two seasons with the club and retiring subsequently.

Honours
Feyenoord
Eredivisie: 1998–99
Johan Cruijff Shield: 1999

References

External links

Beijen profile 
Stats at Voetbal International 

1977 births
Living people
Brazilian footballers
People from Montes Claros
Association football defenders
Association football midfielders
Associação Portuguesa de Desportos players
América Futebol Clube (MG) players
Eredivisie players
Feyenoord players
RBC Roosendaal players
NEC Nijmegen players
ADO Den Haag players
Cypriot First Division players
AEK Larnaca FC players
Brazilian expatriate footballers
Expatriate footballers in the Netherlands
Expatriate footballers in Cyprus
Brazilian expatriate sportspeople in the Netherlands
Brazilian expatriate sportspeople in Cyprus
Sportspeople from Minas Gerais